This article details the history of the Tampa Bay Buccaneers American football franchise.

Origins
Expansion of the National Football League to twenty-eight teams was an agreed part of the AFL/NFL merger of 1970 and confirmed at the end of that season, but attempts to carry it out did not materialise until after the 1973 season, when it was announced that Tampa would be the first city to get an expansion franchise,<ref>"Owner: Franchise for Tampa"; in St. Petersburg Times; April 24, 1974; p. 1C</ref> at a cost of US$16 million (which even then was considered a “paltry” sum).  Part of the reason for the delay was due to uncertainties in a few of the newly integrated teams’ stadiums due to new NFL capacity requirements; both the Buffalo Bills and Boston Patriots had stadiums inadequate for the NFL, so that Tampa interests unsuccessfully courted both teams to move to the Tampa Bay area.No byline (March 12, 1970). Pros in Tampa? The Evening Independent. Retrieved from Google Newspapers May 8, 2014. Once Rich and Schaefer Stadiums were built for the Bills and Patriots respectively, the league was stable enough to begin expanding.

Originally the proposed Tampa Bay expansion franchise was awarded to Tom McCloskey, a construction company owner from Philadelphia. McCloskey quickly became dissatisfied with the financial arrangement with the NFL, and backed out of the deal a month later. Hugh Culverhouse, a wealthy tax attorney from Jacksonville, who had failed in his bid to buy the Los Angeles Rams due to an unannounced sale to Robert Irsay, instead received the Tampa franchise.

A name-the-team contest resulted in the name “Buccaneers”, a reference to the pirates who frequented Florida's Gulf coast during the 17th century, and which was almost immediately shortened to the familiar “Bucs”. The team's first home was Tampa Stadium, which had recently been expanded to seat just over 72,000 fans.

John McKay and early frustration (1976–1978)
The Buccaneers joined the NFL as members of the AFC West in 1976. The following year, they were moved to the NFC Central, while the other 1976 expansion team, the Seattle Seahawks, switched conferences with Tampa Bay and joined the AFC West. This realignment was dictated by the league as part of the 1976 expansion plan, so that both teams could play each other twice and every other NFL franchise once during their first two seasons.

Longtime USC coach John McKay was recruited as the team's first head coach. McKay had never been a fan of the NFL and turned down three previous offers for a coaching position, but was finally convinced after being offered a $3 million contract and the challenge of building a new team from scratch. He stressed a five-year plan that relied on veteran players, quality draft picks, and patience. However, the expansion draft prior to the entrance of the Bucs and Seahawks into the league was not as generous as it would become for later NFL expansion teams, so the Buccaneers were saddled with aging veterans and castoffs from other teams. Despite McKay's coaching, the Bucs often appeared incompetent, with missed tackles, fumbled snaps, and a frustrating inability to score, and the patience of fans and local media soon wore thin. McKay was also criticized for relying too much on the USC playbook—for example, the “student body right” rushing play—not to mention choosing running back Ricky Bell over future NFL Hall of Famer Tony Dorsett in the 1977 NFL Draft.

This frustration, and even anger, that Buccaneer fans targeted at McKay – which prompted the brief popularity of bumper stickers that proclaimed “Throw McKay in the Bay” – stemmed from the team's notorious 26-game regular season losing streak, including a then-record 0–14 season (a record since broken by the 2008 Detroit Lions and 2017 Cleveland Browns who each finished 0–16). The 1976 Bucs are widely considered one of the worst NFL teams of all time. They were shut out five times and scored only 125 points the entire season, an average of nine per game, while giving up 412. The Buccaneers suffered so many injuries that they were forced to hire players off the street and from the CFL. The team became the butt of many jokes, especially from Johnny Carson on The Tonight Show, but also from fans themselves, who late into the 1977 season, wore bags on their heads and encouraged the team to “go for 0”, as in zero wins. After a particularly dismal effort during the streak, McKay gave perhaps the quintessential comment on the team's plight. In a post-game press conference, Tampa Tribune sports editor Tom McEwen asked McKay about the execution of his team's offensive line. McKay responded,Another choice quotation that summed up his frustration at the time:

The 1977 season started even worse as the Buccaneers were shut out six times. In Week 13 the Buccaneers finally managed to win their first regular-season game (the team had beaten the Atlanta Falcons 17–3 in a 1976 pre-season game), defeating the New Orleans Saints on the road 33–14. The win was highlighted by three interceptions returned for touchdowns, an NFL record at the time. (The team would later equal this feat 25 years later when they defeated the Oakland Raiders in Super Bowl XXXVII.) Saints QB Archie Manning had said that it would be a disgrace to lose to Tampa Bay, and after the game was over the Buccaneers players taunted him by chanting “It’s disgraceful!”. Manning to this day disputes the charge that he said this. Others have noted that McKay may have made the statement up to motivate the team. After being greeted by 8,000 cheering fans when the team arrived back in Tampa late that evening after the game, the  Buccaneers followed up the victory with a win at home over the St. Louis Cardinals during the final week of the season. Afterwards, a mob of fans ran onto the field and tore down the goalposts.

The 1978 season was another losing campaign, but it was highlighted by the presence of rookie quarterback Doug Williams. Despite a season-ending injury in which his mouth had to be wired shut, he showed enough potential to give Buccaneers fans hope for the future. His leadership and often electrifying play would transform the team much sooner than anyone expected. Injuries led to a 5–11 record, but for the first time the Buccaneers began to resemble a real team.

A brief period of success (1979–1982)
The Bucs’ situation improved rapidly in 1979. With the maturation of quarterback Doug Williams, the first 1,000-yard rushing season from running back Ricky Bell, and a smothering, league-leading defense led by future NFL Hall of Famer Lee Roy Selmon, the Bucs kicked off the season with five consecutive victories, a stunning performance that landed them on the cover of Sports Illustrated.

With four games left in the season, the Bucs only needed to win one of them to make the playoffs, and did so in their final contest at home against the Kansas City Chiefs, which was played in the worst downpour in Bucs history. Finishing with a 10–6 record, the Bucs had their first winning season, and indeed won the Central Division in a tiebreaker over the Chicago Bears. In an upset, the Bucs defeated the Philadelphia Eagles 24–17 in the divisional round of the playoffs. Because the Los Angeles Rams defeated the Dallas Cowboys in the other NFC playoff game, the Bucs hosted the NFC Championship Game the following week in Tampa. The Bucs lost to the Rams 9–0, thanks to great defense by the Rams. In only their fourth season, the Bucs seemed on the verge of fulfilling McKay's five-year plan.

Injuries plagued the team again in 1980, and the Bucs were limited to five wins, ten losses, and one tie against the also injury-plagued Packers.

The Bucs made the playoffs again despite mediocre performance in the 1981 season, winning a weak division and entering the first round during the strike-shortened 1982 season. The 1981 season came down to a thrilling final game at Detroit. The winner would take the Central Division crown and the loser would miss the playoffs. The Lions had not lost at home all season. Although the Bucs trailed early, an 84-yard touchdown bomb from QB Williams to WR Kevin House and a fumble recovery for a touchdown by David Logan sealed the shocking win for the Bucs. The Dallas Cowboys rewarded the Bucs’ efforts with a 38–0 blowout in the divisional round of the playoffs.

The 1982 season started just as poorly, as the Buccaneers went 0–3 before a players’ strike shut down the NFL for seven weeks. When the league resumed play, the Bucs were nicknamed the “Cardiac Kids” for winning five of their next six games all in the final moments to go 5–4 and qualify for the expanded playoff slate. In the first round, the Bucs once again faced the Cowboys at home in Dallas, but the Bucs put up a much better fight, actually leading the game at the half but lost 30–17.

The Bucs did not return to the playoffs, nor have another non-losing season under Culverhouse's ownership.

The worst team in the league (1983–1996)
Doug Williams was the lowest-paid starting quarterback in the NFL during the 1982 season, and his salary of $120,000 was less than several backups. At the end of the season, Williams asked for a raise to $600,000 per season—a reasonable sum at that time, given Williams’ past performance and his market value. However, Culverhouse would not offer more than $400,000 despite McKay's protests. Feeling that Culverhouse was unwilling to pay him a salary befitting his status as an NFL starter, Williams bolted to the USFL, where he played two seasons for the Oklahoma/Arizona Outlaws.

Without Williams, the Bucs appeared to be a rudderless team. The Bucs started the next season by losing their first nine games, knocking them out of playoff contention. They finished with a 2–14 record, the first of an NFL-record 12 consecutive seasons with ten or more losses. Many Bucs fans blamed Williams’ departure for this seemingly endless streak of futility, and the fact that Williams later returned to the NFL and led the Washington Redskins to victory in Super Bowl XXII only deepened the frustration among Bucs fans.

It can be argued that the team's lengthy woes were primarily due to how Culverhouse ran the organization. Culverhouse kept the team's payroll among the lowest in the league, which prompted few quality players to sign with the team. The ones who did rarely stayed long. Selmon, the Bucs’ first draft pick in 1976 and the first Hall of Famer to have earned his credentials primarily in Tampa Bay, was the only real star who had a long tenure with the team.

The Bucs suffered from several missteps in the NFL Draft. The most notorious of these blunders was the team's selection of 1985 Heisman Trophy winner Bo Jackson as the #1 overall pick when he openly stated he would never play for them. Jackson had never forgiven Culverhouse or the Bucs when they flew him to Tampa for a physical and a visit at the team's expense during his senior year at Auburn, leading him to believe that the NCAA and Southeastern Conference had approved the trip. In truth, they had not done so, and the trip cost Jackson his eligibility during his senior baseball season. Jackson believed the Bucs had deliberately tried to sabotage his baseball career, and told Culverhouse that "you're going to be wasting a draft pick" if they selected him.

Earlier, in the 1977 draft, the Bucs had passed on future Hall of Fame running back Tony Dorsett with the No. 1 overall pick in favor of Ricky Bell, who had played for McKay at USC, while they subsequently traded away picks that turned into eventual Hall of Famers Dan Hampton and Irving Fryar. The franchise also frequently traded or gave up on quality players who went on to greater success on other teams. The most notable examples were all quarterbacks: Williams; Steve Young, who was traded to the San Francisco 49ers after the Bucs drafted Vinny Testaverde first overall in the 1987 draft, only to become a Super Bowl MVP and Hall of Famer with San Francisco; and Testaverde, whom the Bucs let walk to the Cleveland Browns via free agency in 1992.

The front-office woes affected the team regardless of who was brought in to coach. McKay stepped down at the end of the 1984 season and was succeeded by Leeman Bennett, who had coached the Atlanta Falcons to their first-ever playoff win. After two disastrous 2–14 seasons, he was replaced by former New York Giants and University of Alabama head coach Ray Perkins. Perkins brought back much-needed discipline and “three-a-day” practices, but this proved too much of a good thing.  The team was so physically drained by game day that the losses continued to pile up, and Perkins was fired before the end of the 1990 season.  Offensive coordinator Richard Williamson became interim head coach, and had the "interim" tag removed following a promising finish to the 1990 season. The momentum didn't last, however, and Williamson was fired after the 1991 season when the team regressed to 3–13, their worst season since 1986.

Largely due to the Bucs’ wretched showings on the field, attendances were typically among the lowest in the league. Usually, the only times that games attracted crowds anywhere near capacity were when the Chicago Bears and Green Bay Packers came to town and brought thousands of their fans with them. Both teams had large followings in Tampa Bay due to the large number of Midwestern expatriates in the area. As a result, most Bucs home games were blacked out locally. At one point, 32 home games in a row from 1982 to 1986 – all or part of five seasons – were not televised locally.

It wasn't until the hiring of Sam Wyche that Bucs fans had reason for optimism. Wyche had coached the Cincinnati Bengals to a Super Bowl appearance, when Cincinnati might have won if not for a fourth quarter comeback engineered by 49ers QB Joe Montana. Wyche did not have immediate success in Tampa, and even his bold “five-dash-two” (indicating five wins and two losses) declaration in his final season with the Bucs proved premature. However, Wyche deserves credit for drafting three key players who would later prove to be the core of the team's renewed success on defense – Warren Sapp, Derrick Brooks and John Lynch.

Things only really began to change, however, after Culverhouse died of lung cancer in 1994.

New ownership, Tony Dungy, and a return to contention (1996–2001)
Despite the profitability of the Buccaneers in the 1980s, Culverhouse's death revealed a team close to bankruptcy, which surprised many observers. His son, Miami attorney Hugh Culverhouse, Jr., practically forced the trustees of his father's estate to sell the team, which cast doubt on the future of the Buccaneers in Tampa. Interested parties included New York Yankees owner George Steinbrenner and Baltimore Orioles owner Peter Angelos, the latter of whom publicly declared he would move the team to Baltimore, which had lacked an NFL franchise since the Colts were relocated to Indianapolis. There was also talk of moving the Buccaneers to nearby Orlando, but mayor Glenda Hood ruled out razing the Citrus Bowl to build an NFL stadium. After Art Modell moved the Cleveland Browns to Baltimore and Georgia Frontiere moved the Rams to St. Louis, rumours of relocation to the vacated markets of Los Angeles or Cleveland‘Modell holding tough, so are Browns supporters: Buccaneers enter Cleveland picture’; Cincinnati Post; January 18, 1996, p. 1C emerged, as did talk of moving to Hartford, Connecticut.

However, in a last-minute surprise, Malcolm Glazer outbid both of them for $192 million, the highest sale price for a professional sports franchise up to that point. Glazer immediately placed his sons Bryan, Edward, and Joel in charge of the team's financial affairs, and the family's deep pockets and serious commitment to fielding a winning team — in Tampa — allowed the Bucs to finally become competitive. The team's performance dramatically improved when the Glazers hired Minnesota Vikings defensive coordinator Tony Dungy as head coach, jettisoned the old “creamsicle” uniforms, and convinced Hillsborough County voters to raise sales taxes to partially fund the construction of Raymond James Stadium.

1996 season: Dungy’s first year

During Dungy's first season in 1996, the team continued to struggle, starting the season 1–8. However, in the second half of the season they finished 5–2, primarily due to the performance of a defense ranked seventh in the NFL led by Hardy Nickerson and the maturing of Wyche's draftees Brooks, Lynch and Sapp.  Dungy, widely renowned for his somber, even-tempered personality, quickly brought balance and morale to the team. Defensive coordinator Monte Kiffin developed and refined their trademark Tampa 2 defensive scheme, which became the foundation for Tampa Bay's future success, not to mention a blueprint copied by other teams in the NFL, including the Chicago Bears and the St. Louis Rams.

The 1997 season: Back to the playoffs

Everything finally came together in 1997. The team started the season 5–0, picking up where they left off the previous year, and this quick start once again landed them on the cover of Sports Illustrated—not once, but twice.  The Bucs went 10–6 for their first winning season and playoff appearance since 1982, as a wild-card team. In the Bucs’ final home game at Houlihan's Stadium (formerly Tampa Stadium), the team defeated the Detroit Lions 20–10 for only the second playoff win in franchise history. They lost at Lambeau Field to the eventual NFC champion Green Bay Packers 21–7. Still, there was reason for optimism, and the expectations were high for the following season.

1998–2001: “The New Sombrero”
The 1998 season, the first to be played in the newly constructed Raymond James Stadium, saw the Bucs lose several close games en route to a disappointing 8–8 record.  The 1999 season saw much better fortunes.  On the strength of the NFL's number one overall defense and a surprising performance by rookie QB Shaun King, the Bucs finished the season with an 11–5 record and won their third NFC Central championship. They edged the Washington Redskins 14–13 in the Divisional round, before losing to the eventual Super Bowl champion St. Louis Rams in an unusually low-scoring NFC Championship Game, 11–6.  The Bucs’ loss was controversial, highlighted by the unusual reversal of a pass from King to WR Bert Emanuel.  Despite the fact that Emanuel clearly controlled the ball at every point during the catch, booth replay official Jerry Markbreit ordered a review of the call. Referee Bill Carollo determined that the nose of the ball had touched the ground as he brought it into his body.  The resulting reversal all but ended the Bucs' hopes of mounting a game-winning drive. In league meetings later that year, NFL later changed the rules regarding what constituted an incomplete pass, which was a backhanded admission that the reversal was incorrect.

Offensive woes
In spite of Dungy's success at coaching Tampa Bay into a winner, one of the consistent criticisms from the media and from fans—and later, from players including Warren Sapp—was that the defense was expected to shoulder too much of the responsibility for winning games.  Beyond fullback Mike Alstott and running back Warrick Dunn—who served as a one-two punch ground attack—and wide receiver Keyshawn Johnson, the team was otherwise underwhelming on offense.  Despite the ongoing criticism, Dungy remained staunchly loyal to his coaching staff, but at the conclusion of the 1999 season, general manager Rich McKay forced Dungy to fire offensive coordinator Mike Shula.  He was replaced by former Minnesota Vikings and Tennessee Titans offensive coordinator Les Steckel in 2000, and the result was the Bucs' highest-scoring season ever, another 10–6 record, and another trip to the playoffs as a wild card. despite his transformation of the team's offense, Steckel's drill sergeant approach to coaching (he was a colonel in the Marines) was a poor fit for the franchise. He was fired at the end of the season, after the Bucs lost 21–3 to the Philadelphia Eagles.

Rather than choose from the pool of strong offensive coordinators available at the end of the 2000 campaign (including former Redskins coach Norv Turner), Dungy decided to elevate his receivers coach Clyde Christensen to the position. It can be argued that this controversial decision was the final nail in the coffin for Dungy's tenure. Although the team achieved a 9–7 winning record in 2001, they barely made it into the playoffs as the lowest-seeded wild card.  To add insult to injury, the Bucs were once again blown out by the Eagles—this time, 31–9.

Frustrated with the team's inability to reach the Super Bowl despite a league-dominating defense, Malcolm Glazer fired Dungy the following day—a decision that created more controversy among devoted players and fans.  Despite whatever weaknesses that may have been ascribed to him, Dungy was highly respected around the league as a man of solid character and a coach to whom players were fiercely loyal.  Dungy went on to coach the Colts to the Super Bowl XLI championship against the Chicago Bears, in the process becoming the first African-American head coach to win the Super Bowl.

Jon Gruden, the Super Bowl, and beyond (2002–2008)
Dungy was soon hired as the head coach of the Indianapolis Colts, while the Bucs mounted a prolonged and much-maligned search for his replacement.  Several potential candidates were offered the job, including University of Florida head coach Steve Spurrier, Bill Parcells and Baltimore Ravens defensive coordinator Marvin Lewis. Spurrier jumped to the Redskins when he was offered the most lucrative salary package ever offered to an NFL head coach, and Parcells eventually passed on the Bucs’ offer—the second time he had done so in the history of the franchise.  Bucs general manager Rich McKay threw his support behind Lewis, and his hiring appeared so certain that the Ravens held a going-away party for him. The Glazer brothers were so displeased with the selection of a yet another defensive-minded coach that they overruled McKay and took control of the candidate search themselves. They made it clear that their top choice was Jon Gruden. The problem was that he was still under contract to the Oakland Raiders.

While talks with the Raiders were secretly underway, the Glazers publicly pursued another respected offensive mind, San Francisco 49ers head coach Steve Mariucci.  Just when initial reports indicated that Mariucci had agreed to become both the Bucs' head coach and general manager, Raiders owner Al Davis agreed to release Jon Gruden to Tampa Bay.  Observers suggested that the Glazers' offer to Mariucci was merely a clever bargaining tactic: since Davis' large ego is well documented, it was very likely he wouldn't allow such a blockbuster trade to take place so near his turf.  If the tactic didn't work, then the Bucs would still get the type of head coach the Glazers desired.

The Glazers’ shrewd move eventually paid off in acquiring Gruden, but it cost the team dearly.  The team hired Gruden away from the Raiders on February 20, 2002, but the price was four draft picks, including the Bucs' first and second round picks in 2002, their first round pick in 2003, and their second round selection in 2004, along with $8 million in cash; the league as a result prohibited any further trading of draft picks for coaches. Gruden, who was frustrated by the limitation of his coaching authority by Davis, was more than pleased to return to Tampa Bay, as his parents lived nearby, and he had spent part of his childhood in Tampa in the early 1980s when his father had worked as a Bucs running back coach and director of player personnel.

The 2002 season: Super Bowl champions
Upon his arrival in Tampa, Gruden immediately went to work, acquiring former Jacksonville Jaguars wide receiver Keenan McCardell, and running back Michael Pittman from the Arizona Cardinals. The Bucs needed to improve their sluggish offense, as the league's sweeping realignment sent the Bucs to the new NFC South division, along with the Atlanta Falcons, Carolina Panthers and New Orleans Saints.

The offensive retooling worked, and combined with the league's top defense, the 2002 campaign was the Buccaneers’ most successful season to date.  They won the NFC South title with a 12–4 record—the team's best ever—then defeated the San Francisco 49ers in what became coach Steve Mariucci’s last game with that franchise. In a surprising upset, the Bucs won their first NFC Championship on the road against the Eagles in the last NFL game ever played at Veterans Stadium. Cornerback Ronde Barber capped off the win by intercepting a Donovan McNabb pass and returning it 92 yards for a touchdown late in the fourth quarter. Philadelphia fans could only watch in stunned silence.

The Bucs went on to rout Gruden’s former team, the Oakland Raiders, by a score of 48–21 in Super Bowl XXXVII. Gruden’s familiarity with the Raiders’ players and playbook paid off, as John Lynch and other Bucs players recognized some of Oakland's formations and plays at crucial points in the game. The Bucs became the first team to win the Super Bowl without any picks in the first two rounds of the previous spring's NFL Draft, having traded these picks to the Oakland Raiders for the rights to acquire Gruden. Gruden became the youngest head coach to win a Super Bowl.

2003 and 2004: Front-office tensions
Soon after the Super Bowl victory, a growing number of press reports indicated Gruden's lack of patience with general manager McKay. McKay was a major architect of the Bucs rebuilding effort over the previous ten years, and he, like Gruden, had long-established ties to the Tampa Bay area. However, during the 2003 season, the Gruden-McKay relationship deteriorated as the Bucs struggled on the field. In November, Keyshawn Johnson was deactivated by the team ten games into the season for his conduct, which included sideline arguments with Bucs coaches and players. Johnson was eventually traded to the Dallas Cowboys for wide receiver Joey Galloway.

Johnson's unusual deactivation was a definitive sign that Gruden had indeed gained control. In December, the Glazers allowed McKay to leave the Bucs before the end of the regular season, and he promptly joined the Falcons as president and general manager. Thus, McKay watched his first game as a Falcons executive sitting next to owner Arthur Blank in a Raymond James Stadium skybox. The Falcons defeated the Bucs 30–28, another sign of how the season had spiraled downward.  Despite opening the season with a Monday night win over the Eagles in Philadelphia's new stadium, Lincoln Financial Field, the Bucs finished the season 7–9. Combined with the Raiders' dismal 4-12 performance, neither Super Bowl team reached the playoffs that year.

Before the 2004 training camp, personnel issues and the salary cap became primary concerns. Gruden successfully lobbied the Glazers to hire his former general manager from Oakland, Bruce Allen. After Allen's arrival in the Bucs' front office, the team announced that it would not re-sign two of their best defensive players—John Lynch and Warren Sapp—before the regular season even started. Both of their contracts were expiring, and younger players could fill their positions. Lynch was released after medical exams indicated ongoing injury problems. Many Bucs fans were stunned by the move, as Lynch was a very popular player whose aggressive, intelligent play earned him several Pro Bowl appearances.  He was also well regarded for his philanthropic work in the Tampa Bay area.  Lynch was quickly signed by the Denver Broncos, where he had consecutive injury-free Pro Bowl seasons.  Sapp signed with the Oakland Raiders, where he played in a limited role in 2004, and sat out much of the 2005 season with injuries.  Since wide receiver Keenan McCardell refused to play until he was given a better contract or traded, he was sent to the San Diego Chargers for draft compensation.

The distracted Bucs began the 2004 season with a 1–5 record, their worst start since Gruden arrived.  The fading accuracy of kicker Martin Gramatica didn't help matters, as the team lost many close games en route to a 5–11 record, making the Bucs the first NFL team to follow up a Super Bowl championship with back-to-back losing seasons.  The lone highlights of 2004 were the high-quality play of rookie wide receiver Michael Clayton and the return of Doug Williams, who joined the Bucs front office as a personnel executive.

The 2005 season: Another division crown

In the 2005 season, the Bucs returned to their winning ways. The Buccaneers selected Carnell “Cadillac” Williams in the first round of the 2005 draft, and the rookie would provide a running game the Buccaneers hadn't possessed since the days of James Wilder Sr. in the 1980s.  Williams set the NFL record for most yards rushing in his first three games with 474, and was named as the AP's 2005 Offensive Rookie of the Year. His shoes and gloves from the third game of the season are now on display in the Pro Football Hall of Fame.

With their 2005 campaign marking the Buccaneers' 30th Season in the NFL, the team won their first four games before entering a midseason slump hampered by a season-ending injury to starting QB Brian Griese during a win over the Miami Dolphins. Replacement starter Chris Simms struggled early as the Bucs lost games to the San Francisco 49ers and Carolina Panthers, but Simms came into his own when he led the team to a last-minute win over the Washington Redskins in a 36–35 thriller to break that slump. In a gutsy move, Gruden went for the win with a two-point conversion plunge by fullback Mike Alstott.  A booth review of that play was inconclusive, and Redskins coach Joe Gibbs stated after the game his belief that Alstott had not scored.

The Bucs followed up with important wins over their NFC South division rivals, sweeping both the New Orleans Saints and Atlanta Falcons, as well as defeating the Panthers in a rare victory at Carolina.  Even with a tough loss against the Chicago Bears and a humiliating shutout against the New England Patriots, the Bucs finished 11–5 and won the NFC South by virtue of a tie-breaker over the Panthers. The Bucs' 30th Anniversary season would end on a sour note, as they lost 17–10 at home to the Redskins in the wild-card round. A late Bucs touchdown could have tied the game, but the play was ruled incomplete when a booth review upheld the referee’s decision.

The Bucs sent three veteran players to the 2006 Pro Bowl, including cornerback Ronde Barber and punter Josh Bidwell. Outside linebacker Derrick Brooks was named the Pro Bowl MVP, with a 59-yard interception return for a touchdown.

2006

After winning their division in 2005, the Bucs suffered through an abysmal 2006 season. The season was plagued by injuries, with starters such as G Dan Buenning, WR Michael Clayton, RB Carnell Williams, DE Simeon Rice, CB Brian Kelly, and QB Chris Simms all being placed on injured reserve at some point in the season. The season also saw a lot of rookies starting for the Bucs, such as QB Bruce Gradkowski, T Jeremy Trueblood, and G Davin Joseph. The league schedule was also unfriendly to the Bucs, scheduling them for 3 games (two of them away games) within 11 days of each other.

There was more to the lost season than just injuries however, as most of the players put on injured reserve had been done so after the team's 0–3 start, and offensive shutouts in the first two games in which no touchdowns were scored by the Buccaneers. The departure of several key defensive coaches and assistants didn't bode well with players, who complained to some in the media of not being able to hear coaches in team meetings.

Inconsistent and unorganized are how some players referred to one of the newcomers, who most players had a hard time making the transition from long-time favorites Rod Marinelli and others. Some believe the problems in 2006 were rooted in recent years mistakes, lack of salary cap room to bring in high impact free agents, lack of top 50 draft picks over the last 5 or 6 years due to trades, and maybe even a failure to properly assess talent resulting in a lack of contribution from second day draft picks in recent history.

The Bucs started off the season 0–3, with QB Chris Simms throwing only one touchdown against seven interceptions. In the third game of the season, a last-minute loss to the Carolina Panthers, Simms's spleen was ruptured, and he was placed on injured reserve for the rest of the season. After their bye week, the Bucs elected to start rookie quarterback Bruce Gradkowski, a 6th round pick from Toledo.

Gradkowski started off performing decently. People who in hindsight claim the Bucs should have started the more experienced Tim Rattay forget the Bucs nearly upset the New Orleans Saints, and then went on to win two narrow victories: one, against the Cincinnati Bengals, winning on an overturned call resulting in a touchdown; and another against the Philadelphia Eagles, thanks to Matt Bryant’s 62-yard field goal. After these victories, though, Gradkowski’s performance declined. After a 3–17 loss to the New York Giants in heavy winds, the Bucs proceeded to lose five of their next six games, leading them to a record of 3–10 (0–6 in their division). In the loss to the Atlanta Falcons, Gradkowski was replaced in the 4th quarter by Rattay.

In the first half of the Bucs’ next game, against the Chicago Bears, Gradkowski was again replaced by Rattay, who led the team from a 24–3 deficit to a score of 31–31, with three touchdowns in the fourth quarter. However, the Bucs then lost the game in overtime, 34–31. Rattay was then named the new starting quarterback for the last two games for the season. The Bucs finished their season with a 4–12 record, tied for third worst in the NFL.

The Bucs sent three players to the 2007 Pro Bowl, cornerback Ronde Barber, tight end/long snapper Dave Moore (A “Need” player according to Saints coach Sean Payton), and late addition outside linebacker Derrick Brooks (as an injury replacement). This would be Brooks' 10th consecutive Pro Bowl and 10th Pro Bowl overall.

2007: A return to grace
2007 began well for the Buccaneers, as they made a splash in the off season signing veteran quarterback Jeff Garcia, linebackers Cato June and Patrick Chukwurah, and former New York Jets fullback B.J. Askew. However, they suffered heavy losses also, releasing three-time pro bowl defensive end Simeon Rice and starting middle linebacker Shelton Quarles, both of whom spent the majority of their career in Tampa Bay. Further disappointment came in the form of a neck injury sustained by 6-time pro bowler and 12-year veteran fullback Mike Alstott in a preseason match against the New England Patriots. The injury placed Alstott on injured reserve for the rest of the season, and ultimately led to his retirement in January 2008.

The regular season began with a crushing 20–6 loss to the Seattle Seahawks in Qwest Field. But by week 6 the Bucs had turned their fortunes around and had a record of 4–2, including home victories against division rivals the Carolina Panthers and the New Orleans Saints. Running Back Carnell “Cadillac” Williams suffered a season-ending torn patellar tendon in a week 4 home victory over the Panthers, which contributed to a 33-14 blowout loss to former Bucs head coach Tony Dungy's Indianapolis Colts the next week. The Buccaneers' misfortune against non-divisional teams was countered as the season progressed by their domination of the NFC South. In week 15, Micheal Spurlock recorded the first ever kick return touchdown ever scored by a Tampa Bay Buccaneer in a home victory against the Atlanta Falcons. They won all but one of their divisional games and, at the peak of their success, had a record of 9–5. Many factors contributed to this, such as the problems faced by Atlanta, whose star quarterback Michael Vick had been arrested on dog fighting charges in the preseason, and the season-ending ACL tear suffered by New Orleans running back Deuce McAllister. they finished off the season on a low point, however, but still won the NFC South division, and qualified for a playoff spot at 9–7.

Tampa Bay were set to host the New York Giants at Raymond James Stadium for their second home playoff game in three seasons. They began well opening up the scoreboard with the first touchdown of the game, which was a 1-yard Earnest Graham run. However, the Giants outscored the Bucs 24-0 until the last three minutes of play, when Jeff Garcia completed a touchdown pass to Alex Smith to bring the Bucs back to just a ten-point deficit, although an interception by R. W. McQuarters with two minutes left, sealed the victory for Giants. In the end the Buccaneers had been held to 271 yards of total offense and 3 turnovers, and lost the game 24–14.

2008
On January 28, the Buccaneers re-signed head coach Jon Gruden and GM Bruce Allen through the 2011 season. Also during the offseason, the Buccaneers expressed interest in acquiring QB Brett Favre from Green Bay, but he eventually signed with the New York Jets instead. The 2008 regular season began with a loss to New Orleans, followed by three wins, a loss to Denver, two more wins, a defeat in Dallas, and four wins over the Chiefs, Vikings, Lions, and Saints. At 9–3, the Buccaneers were close to guaranteeing their place in the playoffs, with 4 games remaining in the season. However, they fell to Carolina on Monday Night Football, which ended their chances of successfully repeating as division champions. They next lost to Atlanta in overtime, followed by their first home loss of the season to San Diego.

The final week of the season still held playoff hopes, although it would take a Buccaneers win over Oakland coupled with a Dallas loss. The Buccaneers couldn't hold their 4th quarter lead against the Raiders, and lost 31–24. Adding insult to injury, Dallas lost their final game against Philadelphia, giving the Eagles the final wild card playoff spot over Dallas and the Bucs. Having finished 9–7 and missing the playoffs, Jon Gruden was fired January 16, 2009, almost one year to the date he received a contract-extension. GM Bruce Allen was fired on the same date as well. This would usher in a wholesale change of coaches and players leading up to the 2009 season, with Raheem Morris being elevated to head coach on January 17.

A Coaching Carousel and Out of the Playoffs (2009-2018)
Raheem Morris era (2009 to 2011)
2009
Although the 2008 season was a disappointment, 2009 would prove a disaster for the Buccaneers. The team lost seven consecutive matches, including an international series game with New England in London. Finally, in Week 9, the team donned its orange-and-white throwback uniforms and hosted the Packers. Green Bay was struggling with a weak O-line, and the Buccaneers swept to victory 38–28 after a pair of touchdown passes by rookie QB Josh Freeman. Afterwards, the losses resumed as Tampa Bay dropped four games in a row against Miami, New Orleans, Atlanta, Carolina, and New York before they brought down Seattle in Week 15, followed by New Orleans. The team lost the season ender against Atlanta to finish 3–13.

2010
The poor 2009 record of Tampa Bay was in part due to a youthful, inexperienced team (barring a few exceptions such as 35-year-old CB Ronde Barber, the last remaining member of the 2002 Super Bowl team), and it was hoped that they would improve with time. The Buccaneers got off to a 2–0 start in 2010 by beating Cleveland and Carolina, but both proved weak opponents and they could never handle Pittsburgh, a team only two years removed from its 2008 Super Bowl win, losing 38–13. Following their bye week, they beat the Bengals in Cincinnati 24–21.  After the road victory in Cincinnati, the Bucs came home to face the defending Super Bowl champion Saints, who were struggling after a loss to the Arizona Cardinals in which the Cardinals did not score an offensive touchdown, but capitalized on New Orleans turnovers.  A victory would have helped the Bucs towards first place in the NFC South; however, they were blown out 31–6.  The next week saw another home deficit against the St. Louis Rams with the Bucs trailing 6–17 at halftime.  Strong defense shut down the Rams’ offense in the second half, and with two field goals and a late touchdown pass to Carnell “Cadillac” Williams, the Bucs topped the Rams 18–17.  After the game with the team standing at 4–2, head coach Raheem Morris would famously state, “We’re the best team in the NFC.”  The following week, the Bucs would make good on Morris's claim by defeating the Arizona Cardinals on the road in a game where they led 31–14,  fell behind late 35–31, then retook the lead 38–35 and sealed the victory with an Aqib Talib interception of Cardinals quarterback Derek Anderson near the end zone.  With the Bucs and the Atlanta Falcons tied for first place in the division at 5–2, a matchup in Atlanta gave the Bucs a chance to take sole possession of first place.  Trailing 27–14 in the second half, Bucs returner Micheal Spurlock returned a Falcons kickoff for a touchdown to put the Bucs within a touchdown of the lead.  The game came down to fourth down attempt to score from the Falcons 1 yard-line. Rookie running back LeGarrette Blount was stopped up the middle and gave the Falcons the close victory.  Following the tough loss, the Bucs came home and defeated the Carolina Panthers 31–16 before going on the road against the San Francisco 49ers and pitching a 21–0 shutout.  The next week, the Bucs road game against the Baltimore Ravens, their fourth game away from Raymond James Stadium in five weeks, was moved to a late start, and the Bucs lost a hard-fought defensive struggle 17–10. Finally returning home the next week, the team sported their throwback creamsicle uniforms and honored coach John McKay at halftime in a home contest against the Falcons on national television. With a great defensive performance and two interceptions of Falcons quarterback Matt Ryan, it seemed the Bucs would get revenge on the Falcons for their loss four weeks ago, leading 24–14 deep in the second half.  But Falcons returner Eric Weems returned a kick for a touchdown and the Falcons scored offensively to take a 28–24 lead.  Quarterback Josh Freeman attempted the late comeback as he had against the Browns, Bengals, Rams, and Cardinals, but was denied with a Brent Grimes interception.  At 7–5, the Bucs’ playoff hopes seemed less assured, and the team had yet to defeat an opponent with a winning record, while several key starters had been lost for the season.  In a rainy outing at Washington, the Bucs prevailed 17–16 thanks to a botched extra-point attempt by the Redskins, but lost to the Detroit Lions at home in overtime to break the Lions' historic road losing streak.  Needing help to make the playoffs as a wild-card team, the Bucs routed the eventual NFC West champion Seattle Seahawks 38–15 in Tampa.  With the last week of the regular season on the slate, the Bucs needed to defeat the New Orleans Saints in the Superdome, then hope for the defeats of the Green Bay Packers and the New York Giants by the Chicago Bears and Washington Redskins, respectively, as both teams held playoff tiebreakers over the Buccaneers.  The Saints planned to fight the Bucs equally hard, as a victory and a Falcons loss to the Carolina Panthers would give them the #1 seed in the NFC.  The game was close and hard-fought throughout the first half, but two key turnovers by the Bucs defense, a Barrett Ruud forced fumble of Saints running back Julius Jones near the Bucs' goal line and an interception of Saints quarterback Drew Brees near the end of the half, gave the Bucs the slight edge.  A Saints field goal in the fourth quarter cut the Tampa Bay lead to 20–13, but with the Falcons holding a large lead over the Panthers, Saints coach Sean Payton chose to sit Brees and put in backup Chase Daniel.  The Bucs held on and won the game 23–13, finishing the season with a 10–6 record, their best since 2005.  However, the Packers and Giants both won close games as well, thus sending the eventual Super Bowl champion Packers to the playoffs.  For the second time in three years, the Bucs had finished with a winning record, yet missed the playoffs.  The season marked a 7-game improvement over the previous one, and was highlighted by the superb play of second-year quarterback Josh Freeman and a strong rookie class led by Gerald McCoy, Arrelious Benn, Mike Williams, Cody Grimm, and LeGarrette Blount.  No Buccaneers were selected to the Pro Bowl, but left tackle Donald Penn did play in the game as a replacement for Green Bay's Chad Clifton, marking Penn's first appearance.  Raheem Morris finished second in AP NFL Coach of the Year voting, and Mike Williams finished second in Offensive Rookie of the Year voting.

2011
The Buccaneers went into 2011 with high expectations, but they ended up not materializing. Things began on an ominous note when they lost at home in Week 1 to the Lions, who had beaten them the previous December and denied them a playoff appearance. At the bye in Week 7, the Bucs were 4–3 and looked promising to make a postseason push. All of that changed rapidly when they abruptly collapsed and ended up not winning another game for the rest of the season for the longest losing streak in franchise history since 1977. On January 2, 2012, Morris was fired as head coach of the Buccaneers after a 4–12 season, including losing their last ten games.

2012 and 2013: Greg Schiano era

About three weeks after firing Raheem Morris, the Buccaneers hired Greg Schiano from Rutgers as the new head coach. During his introductory conference he stated “There will be Buccaneer men, and there will be a Buccaneer Way.” The phrase “The Buccaneer Way”'' became a slogan amongst fans and local media, describing the new regime and attitude. The team filled out the coaching staff with new faces, including Mike Sullivan, Bill Sheridan, and Butch Davis. In 2013, Dave Wannstedt was also added as special teams coach. In the first day of free agency, the club signed top prospects Vincent Jackson and Carl Nicks, as well as Eric Wright. The $140 million committed to the team during that 24-hour period is considered the largest investment the Glazer family has put into the team going back almost a decade.

The team would finish the 2012 season at 7–9, notably ranking first in rushing defense. Furthermore, the rushing offense was highlighted by the breakout performance of Doug Martin. After two seasons of game day local television blackouts, the improved team began seeing increased attendance and attention, and some blackouts lifted. Six games were blacked out in 2012. For the three-year period of 2010-2012 the Bucs led the NFL in local television blackouts with 19 (Cincinnati was second with 11).  Schiano's coaching style, however, drew criticism at the end of a game against the Giants (Schiano's New Jersey homecoming). With the Bucs losing by seven points, but no longer able to stop the clock with a timeout, Schiano ordered his defense to continue to aggressively tackle quarterback Eli Manning, who was taking a knee to end the game, in the hopes of causing a turnover. Those actions prompted Giants coach Tom Coughlin to verbally reprimand Schiano when the two met at midfield after the game. Schiano did not apologize to Coughlin or the Giants, and the team repeated the tactic several times during the season.

Coming into the 2013 season, fans and analysts had better than average expectations for Tampa Bay. They were expected to improve their record, and potentially make a playoffs run. The predictions proved unfounded, as numerous issues on and off the field saw the team collapse. During training camp, a reported rift began to divide Schiano and quarterback Josh Freeman. After an 0–3 start, Freeman was benched, and ultimately released. Schiano started rookie Mike Glennon, but the team continued to lose. The fans' confidence of Schiano began to decay rapidly, and after an 0–8 start, the team finally got its first win of the season on a Monday night against Miami. A brief win streak saw improvements with Glennon at quarterback, and Bobby Rainey took over at running back with stellar numbers after Doug Martin went down with a shoulder injury. There were no blackouts in 2013, as the Glazers bought up the necessary tickets for two of the games to get to the 85% threshold needed to prevent local blackouts.

Despite some individual improvements, and some impressive performances by members of the defense, the team dropped the last three games of the season, and finished 4–12. The team ranked last or near the bottom in almost every offensive category. On December 30, 2013, Schiano and general manager Mark Dominik were fired.

2014 and 2015: Lovie Smith and Jason Licht era

On January 1, 2014, Lovie Smith was hired as the new head coach of the Buccaneers, replacing Greg Schiano. Smith had previously spent 5 seasons with the Buccaneers from 1996 to 2001 coaching the linebackers under Tony Dungy. During his first news conference with the Bucs, Smith talked about restoring the quality of the team from the late 1990s and early 2000s: “There was a certain brand of football you expected from us”, Smith said. “You know we would be relentless. There was a brand of football that you got from us each week at Raymond James Stadium. It was hard for opponents to come in and win. We have gotten away from that a little bit, and it’s time ... for us to become a relevant team again."

On January 21, 2014, Jason Licht was hired as the new general manager, replacing Mark Dominik. He was officially introduced at One Buc Place on January 23, 2014. In his first news conference, Licht talked about his philosophy:

Reflecting the team's fresh start, the Buccaneers began to wear new uniforms for the 2014 season.

After signing veteran free agent Josh McCown and many more free agents, many analysts predicted that the Buccaneers could be the surprise team of the year and possibly make a playoff run. Those predictions soon went away after the Bucs began the season 0–3, including a 56–14 blowout against the Atlanta Falcons on Thursday Night Football. McCown was injured in that game, and second year quarterback Mike Glennon was named the starter. His first start of the 2014 season ended with the Bucs earning their first victory of the season in Pittsburgh against the Steelers 27–24. The Bucs lost the next 4 games, two overtime loses against the New Orleans Saints and the Minnesota Vikings, one blowout against the Baltimore Ravens and a 5-point loss against the Cleveland Browns. Going into week 10 at 1–8, McCown returned as the starter. Mathematically, the Bucs were still in playoff contention only being 3 games out of first place in the division. McCown's first game back ended with a 27–17 loss to the Falcons but won the following week in a 27–7 blowout against the struggling Washington Redskins. The Bucs would lose the next three games and were officially knocked out of playoff contention in week 14. The Bucs would finish 2–14, winning two fewer games than the previous season and securing the first-overall draft pick in the 2015 NFL draft.

Despite the team's record, first-round draft pick wide receiver Mike Evans had more than 1,000 receiving yards and he became the youngest NFL player to record more than 200 receiving yards in a single game. Vincent Jackson also had more than 1,000 yards receiving, which represented Tampa Bay's first pair of 1,000 yard receivers in a season. Second-year CB Johnthan Banks led the team with 4 interceptions and had 50 tackles. Danny Lansanah flourished in the Tampa 2 system with 81 tackles, 1.5 QB sacks, and 3 interceptions, with 2 of those interceptions returned for touchdowns for the 2014 season. Jacquies Smith, who was signed from Buffalo after waiving rookie DE Scott Solomon a month into the season, had 17 combined tackles, 13 solo tackles, 6.5 sacks, and 1 forced fumble in only 8 starts for 2014.

After the conclusion of the 2014 season, Tampa Bay hired Ben Steele to become the team's new offensive quality control coach as well as former Atlanta Falcons offensive coordinator, Dirk Koetter, to be their new offensive coordinator after parting ways with QB coach and interim offensive coordinator Marcus Arroyo. Having a 2–14 record, tied for worst in the NFL, Tampa gained the 1st overall pick in the 2015 NFL draft. They also made some headlines when they released QB Josh McCown on February 11, 2015 to save $5.25 million in cap space. With the first overall pick in the NFL draft, the Buccaneers selected Jameis Winston from Florida State. Throughout the offseason, there was much debate whether the Buccaneers should pick Jameis, or Oregon QB Marcus Mariota.

On January 6, 2016, Smith was fired by the Buccaneers after posting a record of 8–24 in his two seasons, including a 6–10 record in the 2015 season.

2016-2018: Dirk Koetter era 
On January 15, 2016, Dirk Koetter was promoted from Offensive Coordinator to become the new head coach of the Tampa Bay Buccaneers.

Initially the Buccaneers had success with Koetter as their head coach when they finished 9-7 for their first winning season since 2010. However, the Buccaneers would only win ten games in the next two seasons; and on December 30, 2018, the Buccaneers would fire Koetter as their head coach.

Bruce Arians and Tom Brady era (2019-present)

2019: Bruce Arians' first year as head coach 

In the 2019 off-season the Buccaneers signed former Arizona Cardinals head coach Bruce Arians out of retirement to a four-year contract. Some key off-season signings for Tampa Bay included offensive tackle Donovan Smith, linebacker Shaquil Barrett, and linebacker Deone Bucannon. They also brought in former first round pick wide receiver Breshad Perriman.

In Arians first season as Tampa Bay's head coach, there were expectations of improved play by Jameis Winston. The team finished the season 7–9 including a stretch of four straight wins from weeks 12–15. Winston ended his season with over 5,000 passing yards, 33 touchdowns and 30 interceptions, becoming the first quarterback in NFL history to simultaneously throw for over 30 touchdowns and interceptions in the same season.

2020: Tom Brady leads team to Super Bowl victory 

In the 2020 off-season, Bruce Arians and the Buccaneers decided to move on from Jameis Winston as their quarterback. They went on to sign six-time Super Bowl champion and long time New England Patriots quarterback Tom Brady to a two-year $25 million per year guaranteed salary with $4.5 million in incentives per year as well. Later on, Patriots tight end Rob Gronkowski came out of retirement to play for the Buccaneers alongside Brady.

Tom Brady would lead the team to an 11–5 record in 2020 and a playoff berth for the first time since 2007, knocking off the Washington Football Team in the wild card round to win their first postseason game since their Super Bowl-winning 2002 season, then went on to defeat their division rivals New Orleans Saints, and eliminated the top-seeded Green Bay Packers in the NFC Championship Game to win their first conference title in 18 years, and advance to Super Bowl LV against the Kansas City Chiefs, as the first wild card team to appear in the Super Bowl since the 2010 Green Bay Packers won Super Bowl XLV, as well as the first team in NFL history to play the Super Bowl in their home stadium. The Buccaneers ended up blowing out the Chiefs 31–9 to acquire their second Super Bowl victory. Tom Brady won his NFL record fifth Super Bowl MVP award.

2021: Coming up short 
The Buccaneers enjoyed another strong season going 13-4. But after a 33-15 drubbing of the Philadelphia Eagles to begin the postseason, the Buccaneers lost 30-27 the following week to the Los Angeles Rams, who would go on to win Super Bowl LVI.

2022: End of an era 
On February 2, 2022 Tom Brady announced his intentions to retire from professional football, although 40 days later he announced he would return for a 23rd NFL season, rejoining the Buccaneers in the process. The Buccaneers managed only a 9-8 record good enough as the number 4 seed in the NFC. The Buccaneers would get an early exit from the Dallas Cowboys, losing 31-14. Following the season, Brady would again hang up his cleats, this time "for good".

References

Tampa Bay Buccaneers
Tampa Bay Buccaneers
Tampa Bay Buccaneers